Brachyscome ciliaris, commonly known as variable daisy, is a small bushy perennial herb with a prominent flower, which occurs throughout most of temperate Australia

Description
It grows as a bushy perennial herb up to 45 centimetre in height. Flowers range from white to purple.

Taxonomy
This species was first collected by Jacques Labillardière and published in his 1806 Novae Hollandiae Plantarum Specimen under the name Bellis ciliaris. In 1832 Christian Friedrich Lessing transferred it into Brachyscome, and the name has been Brachyscome ciliaris ever since. Because it is such a variable species, specimens have often been referred to new species, and hence this species has many taxonomic synonyms, among them: Brachyscome drummondii Walp., Brachyscome ciliaris var. brachyglossa Gauba, Brachyscome dimorphocarpa G.L.R.Davis, Brachyscome billardierei Benth. and Brachyscome ciliaris var. lanuginosa (Steetz) Benth..

Three varieties are recognised:
 Brachyscome ciliaris var. ciliaris
 Brachyscome ciliaris var. lanuginosa
 Brachyscome ciliaris var. subintegrifolia

Distribution and habitat
Geographically speaking, it is very widely distributed, occurring in every Australian state. It is somewhat restricted in terms of habitat, however, favouring red earths and grey sands over limestone or clay, in disturbed areas and on the margins of salt pans.

References

ciliaris
Asterales of Australia
Flora of Queensland
Flora of Victoria (Australia)
Flora of Tasmania
Flora of the Northern Territory
Flora of South Australia
Eudicots of Western Australia
Taxa named by Jacques Labillardière